| tries = {{#expr: 
 + 2 +  7 +  6 +  3 +  2 +  6 + 11 +  1 +  6 +  4 + 10 +  6
 + 5 +  7 +  8 +  2 + 13 + 11 +  3 +  5 +  7 +  3 +  4 + 13
 + 1 +  5 +  4 +  9 +  8 +  6 +  4 +  2 +  0 +  6 +  6 +  8
 + 0 + 14 +  3 +  2 +  7 +  5 +  4 +  7 +  5 + 10 + 12 +  5
 + 5 +  6 +  3 +  1 +  4 +  7 +  6 +  5 +  5 + 11 +  7 +  8
 + 4 +  5 +  5 +  7 +  8 + 11 + 16 + 14 +  5 + 15 +  3 +  2
 + 9 +  5 +  7 +  9 + 17 +  5 +  7 +  4 +  7 + 15 +  7 +  5
 + 9 +  5 + 13 + 14 + 16 + 17 + 14 + 12 + 13 + 17 +  4 +  6
 + 5 +  5 +  2 +  2 +  6 +  7 +  4
}}
| top point scorer = Ludovic Mercier (Gloucester)(112 points)
| top try scorer = Alexandre Bouyssie (Bordeaux-Bègles)Darragh O'Mahony (Saracens)(9 tries)
| venue = Kassam Stadium, Oxford
| attendance2 = 12,000
| champions =  Sale Sharks
| count = 1
| runner-up =   Pontypridd
| website = https://web.archive.org/web/20080506141030/http://www.ercrugby.com/eng/
| previous year = 2000–01
| previous tournament = 2000–01 European Challenge Cup
| next year = 2002–03
| next tournament = 2002–03 Parker Pen Challenge Cup
}}
The 2001–02 European Challenge Cup (known as the Parker Pen Shield for sponsorship reasons) was the 6th season of the European Challenge Cup, Europe's second tier club rugby union competition below the Heineken Cup. A total of 32 teams participated, representing seven countries.

The pool stage began when Connacht hosted Narbonne on 28 September 2001 and ended with four matches on 13 January 2002.  The knockout stages followed, culminating in the final at the Kassam Stadium in Oxford on 26 May 2002.

The defending champions, Englands's Harlequins, did not have a chance to defend their crown because they qualified to play in the Heineken Cup.  Sale Sharks claimed a narrow victory over Pontypridd in the final and picked up their first piece of European Club silverware.

Teams
The allocation of teams was as follows:
England: 6 teams — all teams from the Zurich Premiership that did not qualify for the 2001–02 Heineken Cup
France: 10 teams — all teams from the Top 16 that did not qualify for the Heineken Cup
Ireland: 1 team — the Irish team from the Celtic League that did not play in the Heineken Cup
Italy: 8 teams — all the teams from the Super 10 that did not qualify for the Heineken Cup
Romania: 1 team specially created for the competition 
Spain: 2 teams — drawn from the División de Honor de Rugby
Wales: 4 teams — all the teams from the Celtic League that did not qualify for the Heineken Cup
Scotland was not represented as both of its teams (Edinburgh and Glasgow) played in the Heineken Cup.

Pool stage

{| class="wikitable"
|+ Key to colours
|-
| style="background: #ccffcc;" |     
| Winner of each pool, advance to quarterfinals. Seed # in parentheses
|}

Pool 1

Pool 2

Pool 3

Pool 4

Pool 5

Pool 6

Pool 7

Pool 8

Seeding

Knockout stage
All kickoff times are local to the match location.

Quarter-finals

Semi-finals

Final

See also
European Challenge Cup
2001-02 Heineken Cup

References

 
2001–02 rugby union tournaments for clubs
2001-02
2001–02 in European rugby union
2001–02 in English rugby union
2001–02 in French rugby union
2001–02 in Irish rugby union
2001–02 in Italian rugby union
2001–02 in Romanian rugby union
2001–02 in Welsh rugby union
2001–02 in Spanish rugby union